Lahsasna is a small town and rural commune in Berrechid Province of the Casablanca-Settat region of Morocco. The 2014 Moroccan census recorded a population of 9315 people living in 1693 households in the commune. At the time of the 2004 census, the commune had a total population of 9495 people living in 1459 households.

References

Populated places in Berrechid Province
Rural communes of Casablanca-Settat